Herbert Kelcey (October 10, 1856 – July 10, 1917) born Herbert Henry Lamb, was an English-born American stage and film actor.

Biography
Born in 1856 in London, Kelcey made his stage debut at Brighton, in 1877 and had his first appearance in London in 1880. He went to New York and first appeared at Wallack's Theatre in 1882. He appeared in many society dramas.  In the 1890s he formed a partnership with Effie Shannon that mimicked English husband-wife acting teams like the Bancrofts and the Kendals. In 1902 Kelcey became the second actor in America to play Sherlock Holmes after William Gillette.

Personal
Kelcey was married to actress Caroline Hill from the 1870s to the early 1890s. Some film and theater sources claim he was later married to Shannon, whom he was in a theatrical partnership with, but there is no evidence they were ever married. Shannon had been married to Henry Guy Carleton from 1890-92 so she would've been free to marry Kelcey when they began their theatrical partnership. Kelcey died in 1917 and Shannon long outlived him. When she died in 1954 she was buried beside him in Saint Anns Cemetery in Sayville New York.

Selected plays
The Silver King (1883)
The Moth and the Flame (1893)
A Coat of Many Colors (1897)
My Lady Dainty (1901)
Manon Lescaut (1901)
Her Lord and Master (1902)
Taps (1904)
The Daughters of Men (1907)
The Learned Ladies (1911)
Years of Discretion (1912)
Children of Earth (1915)
Pollyanna (1916)

Filmography
After the Ball (1914)
The Sphinx (1916)

References

External links

pages to the actor
portraits(archived)
 Portraits (University of Louisville)
New York Public Library, Billy Rose collection
 Herbert Kelcey Portraits (University of Washington, Sayre collection)

1856 births
1917 deaths
Male actors from London
English male actors
19th-century English male actors
English male stage actors